Sigird Rudebecks Gymnasium, often called Rudebecks, is a private high school that was founded 1869 by reform educator, Sigrid Rudebeck. It is along with Göteborgs Högre Samskola, one of Gothenburg's most esteemed high schools with high academic results. The school is located in central Gothenburg, on Bellmansgatan in Vasastaden, Sweden. The school has approximately 450 students.

Notable alumni
Mats Malm, Secretary of the Swedish Academy
Jesper Brodin, CEO Ikea 
Lars Strannegård, Professor
Richard Friberg, Professor
Nicola Clase, Ambassador
Björn Lindeblad, Speaker
Lotta Lundgren, Writer
Ester Schreiber, fencing

References

External links

Education in Gothenburg
Educational institutions established in 1869
Gymnasiums (school) in Sweden
1869 establishments in Sweden